Guzmania pearcei is a species of flowering plant in Bromeliaceae family. It is native to Ecuador and Colombia.

References

pearcei
Flora of Ecuador
Flora of Colombia
Plants described in 1887
Taxa named by John Gilbert Baker
Taxa named by Lyman Bradford Smith